Visitors to Cambodia must obtain a visa unless they are a citizen of one of the visa-exempt countries. All visitors must hold a passport containing at least one empty page that is valid for at least six months, as well as a return or onward ticket.

Visa policy map

Visa exemption

Ordinary passports

Holders of normal passports of all  ASEAN nationals do not require a visa to enter Cambodia. According to the Ministry of Foreign Affairs and International Cooperation of Cambodia, the maximum allowed period of stay depends on nationality:

#: Not listed by Timatic as being visa-exempt.

In addition, according to the Ministry of Foreign Affairs and International Cooperation of Cambodia, nationals of the  do not need a visa for a maximum stay of 15 days. This, however, is not supported by Timatic, which states that nationals of the Seychelles must obtain a visa.

Non-ordinary passports
Holders of diplomatic and official/service passports of Belarus, Brazil, Brunei, Bulgaria, China, Cuba, Ecuador, Hungary, India, Indonesia, Iran, Japan, Laos, Malaysia, Mongolia, Myanmar, Peru, Philippines, Russia, Serbia,  Seychelles, Singapore, Slovakia, South Korea, Thailand, Uruguay and Vietnam do not require a visa to enter Cambodia.

Future visa-exemption plans
In July 2015 tourism industry representatives proposed a wider visa-free regime as a response to similar moves by neighbouring countries.

Visa on arrival

Nationals of any country may obtain a visa on arrival for tourism (US$30) or business purposes (US$35), for a maximum stay of 30 days. Extensions are possible.

eVisa

Nationals of any country may also apply for an eVisa online for US$36 prior to arriving in Cambodia. The eVisa allows for a single entry and a maximum stay of 30 days for tourism purposes.

Holders of eVisas may enter via the following entry points:
Phnom Penh International Airport
Siem Reap International Airport
Sihanoukville International Airport
Cham Yeam (Koh Kong Province) (from Thailand)
Poipet (Banteay Meanchey Province) (from Thailand)
Bavet (Svay Rieng Province) (from Vietnam)
Trapeang Kriel (Stung Treng Province) (from Laos)

Transit
Transit passengers who are leaving on the same arrival aircraft do not need a visa when transiting through Phnom Penh International Airport.

Admission restrictions
Day trips (arriving and departing on the same day) are not permitted, except when arriving and departing via Phnom Penh International Airport.

History
During the COVID-19 pandemic, entry was not allowed for persons who had previously visited or who are originating from France, Germany, Italy, Spain or the United States.

Statistics
Most visitors arriving to Cambodia on short-term basis were from the following countries of nationality:

See also

Visa requirements for Cambodian citizens
Cambodian passport

References

Sources

Ministry of Foreign Affairs and International Cooperation, Kingdom of Cambodia
Apply for a tourist visa online to the Kingdom of Cambodia
Cambodian Department of Immigration
Map of immigration checkpoints which accept e-visa or visa on arrival

Cambodia